NBA Fastbreak '98 is a basketball simulator released for the Sony PlayStation in 1997. It takes place during the 1997-98 National Basketball Association season. It was published by Midway Games and GT Interactive. Originally announced under the title "Hardwood Heroes", the game was released with minimal changes as NBA Action 98 on Sega Saturn and Microsoft Windows, published by Sega. Another version was being developed by Z-Axis for the Nintendo 64 under the title "NBA Fast Break 64", with a prospective November 1997 release, but it was cancelled.

Gameplay
NBA FastBreak '98 uses icon passing. Unusual for a basketball game of its time, it has a practice mode which allows players to learn moves outside the pressures of a game.

Reception

Most reviews for the game ranged from middling to moderately positive. Critics overwhelmingly praised the advanced and detailed graphics, but many also noted that they come at the cost of low game speed, making the gameplay feel sluggish. The sound was also widely criticized, especially the weak crowd noises, which Jay Boor of IGN compared to a "fizzled three-inch speaker", as well as remarking upon the poor quality of the rim sounds. However, critics widely praised the controls, the practice mode, and the numerous options for customizing the game. Sega Saturn Magazine added that since the options screens are kept simple, there is no loading when making changes, which encourages using these features.

Electronic Gaming Monthly (EGM) and GameSpots reviews for the Saturn version commented that, while not in any way spectacular, the game is solid and enjoyable and, with the Saturn having had a fairly weak lineup of basketball games, it stands as the best basketball game on the Saturn. While opining that the PlayStation version is slightly better due to its sharper graphics, EGMs review for this version was less enthusiastic, saying that the PlayStation offers superior basketball video games. Contrarily, both GamePro and Sega Saturn Magazines reviews for the Saturn release considered it to be an excellent game even in absolute terms, with GamePro saying it "delivers with more authority than a Shaq tip-slam!" A different GamePro critic reviewed the PlayStation version and had a more middling response, commenting that "... FastBreak does a good job of capturing the NBA experience, but it's missing the attitude that pushes NBA Live to the top. Dunks aren't slammed with authority, players don't get shoved to the ground very often, and the game sometimes turns into a cherry-pickin' battle as long passes lead to some easy baskets." GameSpot also had a different critic review the PlayStation version, who was more positive, calling it a "good first attempt", and commenting that while the game is not the all-around best basketball game on the market, it was strong on enough points to be a viable contender against its competition.

The Saturn version was nominated for the "Best Saturn Game" award at the CNET Gamecenter Awards for 1997, which went to Virtual On: Cyber Troopers. The PC version was a finalist for the Academy of Interactive Arts & Sciences' 1997 "Personal Computer: Sports Game of the Year" award, which went to FIFA: Road to World Cup 98.

Notes

References

External links
 

1997 video games
Basketball video games
GT Interactive games
Midway video games
National Basketball Association video games
PlayStation (console) games
Sega Saturn games
Sega video games
Video games developed in the United States
Windows games